The National Education Institute Slovenia - NEI (ZRSŠ) is the main public organisation in Slovenia that encourages development in education in Slovenia up to pre-university — covering all kindergartens, elementary schools, secondary schools, music schools, and boarding schools.

Responsibilities and areas  
The pedagogical consultants of the National Education Institute Slovenia research, innovate, offer recommendations, and promote changes in practice, theory, and legislation. The basic mission of the institute is to promote lifelong learning according to the goals of sustainable development, innovative environments, and innovation in general.

NEI performs research and counseling, supports  innovation, links practice with theory and legislation, and promotes lifelong learning to schools.

History 
The National Education Institute Slovenia was founded on May 22, 1956 as the Educational Research Institute. On February 21, 1959, it was renamed the Institute for the Development of Education and started operating as a state administrative institution. Its primary duties were evaluation and counselling.

On March 1, 1963, the institute was transformed from a state administrative institution into an independent institution, which henceforth operated on the principles of the then-current policy of self-management. It focused primarily on the didactics and methodology of teaching, the professional development of teachers, and the issue of pedagogical publications; its task was also to gather and study pedagogical documentation.

In 1965 the Institute for the Progress of Education and the Institute for Vocational and Technical Training were merged into the National Education Institute of the SRS. In 1969, the Slovenian Assembly passed the Law on the Pedagogical Service. On its basis the independent self-managing National Education Institute Slovenia was transformed into a state administrative body.

On September 1, 1969, the institutes for education and pedagogic services were transformed into the nine organizational units of the National Education Institute, with regional units in Celje, Dravograd (from 1979 in Slovenj Gradec), Koper/Capodistria, Kranj, Ljubljana, Maribor, Murska Sobota, Novo Mesto, Nova Gorica, Murska Sobota. All of the aforementioned units are still in operation. The main characteristics of the National Education Institute had been common planning, a common programme and joint work reports.

After Slovenia gained independence in 1991, the National Education Institute Slovenia became part of the Ministry of Education and Sports. On July 6, 1995, the National Education Institute Slovenia began to operate as a public institution, which has remained unchanged since. Today, its main responsibilities are counseling, development and research, and other professional tasks in education.

External links 
 National Education Institute Slovenia (English website)

National Education Institute Slovenia
National Education Institute Slovenia
National Education Institute Slovenia
National Education Institute Slovenia
National Education Institute Slovenia
National Education Institute Slovenia
1956 establishments in Yugoslavia